The women's mass start race of the 2015–16 ISU Speed Skating World Cup 3, arranged in Eisstadion Inzell, in Inzell, Germany, was held on 6 December 2015.

Irene Schouten of the Netherlands won the race, while Ivanie Blondin of Canada came second, and Park Do-yeong of South Korea came third. Carien Kleibeuker of the Netherlands won the Division B race.

Results

The race took place on Sunday, 6 December, with Division A scheduled in the afternoon session, at 16:48, and Division B scheduled in the evening session, at 18:07.

Division A

Division B

References

Women mass start
3